Ravar (also Romanized as Rāvar) is a village in Seh Hezar Rural District, Khorramabad District, Tonekabon County, Mazandaran Province, Iran. At the 2006 census, its population was 14, in 5 families.

References 

Populated places in Tonekabon County